Haraba is a village in the Rîbnița District of Transnistria, Moldova. It has since 1990 been administered as a part of the self-proclaimed Pridnestrovian Moldavian Republic (PMR).

References

Villages of Transnistria
Bratslav Voivodeship
Baltsky Uyezd
Rîbnița District